Blairgowrie is a suburb of Johannesburg, South Africa. It is located in Region B of the City of Johannesburg Metropolitan Municipality. It is named after the town of Blairgowrie in Scotland.

The suburb has an active community association called the Blairgowrie Community Association.

History
Prior to the discovery of gold on the Witwatersrand in 1886, the future suburb lay on land on one of the original farms that make up Johannesburg, called Klipfontein. The farm was bought by  William Grey Rattray in 1890 and renamed it Craighall. In 1928, his daughter would rename part of the land on the farm after the town Blairgowrie and Rattray in Scotland. The suburb consisted of 406 stands over 56 ha.

References

Johannesburg Region B